Anastasios Andreou (born 1877 in Limassol, Ottoman Cyprus; died 1947) was a Greek athlete from Cyprus.  He competed at the 1896 Summer Olympics in Athens.

He was born in Limassol in 1877. He studied at the Greek School of Limassol where he was declared Multi-victorious Champion.

He was successful in the first Pan Cypriot games in 1896,  winning the 100 metres and 110 metres hurdles. He represented Cyprus in the first Pan-Hellenic Games in the 110 metres hurdling. His success in Pan-Hellenic Games and participation at Olympics were an honour for Sport in Cyprus. 
 
He was a volunteer in the Greek army for the Greek-Turkish war of 1897 and fought in Domokon Derven, Phoulnea and Farsala.

He married Penelope Eraclidou and had one son and two daughters. He died in 1947.

References

External links

Biography of Cypriots (1800-1920) by Aristidis Koudounaris.

1877 births
1947 deaths
Athletes (track and field) at the 1896 Summer Olympics
19th-century sportsmen
Olympic athletes of Greece
Sportspeople from Limassol
Greek male hurdlers
Cypriot male hurdlers
Place of death missing
Cypriot emigrants to Greece